Ian James Frederick Hutchinson, (born 31 October 1964, Welshpool) is a Welsh former first-class cricketer, who played for Middlesex County Cricket Club. He was educated at Shrewsbury School.

He was a county cricketer for Shropshire, appearing in one match in 1984 when he made 46 runs from both innings, while playing at club level for Shrewsbury.

Hutchinson played five seasons of county cricket for Middlesex, 1987–1991, but was a first-team regular for just two of them. He made his List A cricket debut in 1985 for Shropshire and his first-class debut in 1988; his final county appearance in both forms was in 1991.

A right-handed, middle order batsman, he made 27 first-class appearances; his highest score was 201 not out against Oxford University cricket team in 1989. In 1985, playing club cricket for Cross Arrows cricket club, he scored 204 from 124 balls before lunch, including 14 sixes.

References

External links

1964 births
People from Welshpool
Middlesex cricketers
Shropshire cricketers
Welsh cricketers
Living people